William T. "Barb" Daly was an educator as well as an American football and baseball player and coach.

Head coaching record

College

References

Year of birth missing
Year of death missing
Holy Cross Crusaders baseball players
Holy Cross Crusaders football players
Loyola Wolf Pack football coaches
Spring Hill Badgers football coaches
High school football coaches in Louisiana